Geneviève Calame (30 December 1946 – 8 October 1993) was a Swiss pianist, music educator and composer.

Life
Geneviève Calame was born in Geneva of Greco-Italian ancestry, and studied the piano in Geneva with Lottie Morel and then in Rome with Guido Agosti. She continued her education in Geneva with Louis Hiltbrand and Jacques Guyonnet. She took further courses in composition in London with Pierre Boulez, in Liège with Henri Pousseur and in Paris with Jean-Claude Eloy. She appeared as a piano soloist many times in the Studio de Musique Contenporaine from 1972 to 1983.  She studied electronic and electro-acoustic technology in New York City with Hubert Howe and visual artist Bill Etra.

After completing her education, Geneviève Calame worked as a composer through contemporary music studios in Geneva. In 1971 she and Jacques Guyonnet founded a studio for electronic music, video and information technology under the name A.R.T (Artistic Research Team), and she began to produce audio visual installations, among other works. In 1972 Calame married Jacques Guyonnet and had two children.

Geneviève Calame developed a method for teaching electronic music to children and taught from 1975–1993 at the Geneva's Board of Education and in l'Ecole Supérieure d'Art Visuel in Geneva. In 1976 she served as president of the Geneva section of the International Society of Contemporary Music. She was a leader in Video Art, producing more  than hundred paintings from video still frames. This work was presented in Cannes at the MIP TV and many places around the world, A.R.T. Studios Geneva, Museum of fine ARTS in Lausanne with René Berger, Rio de Janeiro at cecilia Meireles and the Serpentine Gallery in London among others. 
She died in Tijuana (Mexique) in 1993.

Works
Calame composes for orchestra, chamber ensemble, voice, ballet, electronic, multimedia performance. Selected works include:
L'Oiseau du matin (1972), electronic ballet
Mantiq-al-Tayr (1973) for flute, contrabass flute and four electronic sources
Différentielle verticale (1974) for soprano and symphonic orchestra
Lude (1975) for harp alone
Iral (1975) for four trumpets and four trombones
Geometry I, II, III (1975–1976) Videotape
Le chant remémoré (1975) Videotape
Alpha futur (1976) for symphonic orchestra and soprano
Labyrinthes Fluides (1976) Videotape
Tableaux video (1976–1977)
Videocosme (1976) for the electronic poem by Edgar Varèse, Videotape
StEpHAnE mAllArmE (1977) or Un coup de dés jamais n'abolira le hasard... for chamber orchestra
Et l'Oeil rêve... (1977) Visual poem
Les Aubes d'Onomadore (1978) for African instruments and symphonic orchestra
Le Son-Qui-Fut-Mille (1978) for four electronic sources and percussion instruments
Mandala (1978) for seven trumpets or seven female voices
L'Homme-Miroir (1979) for wind orchestra, percussion and four electronic sources
Je lui dis... (1980) for chamber orchestra
Oniria (1981) for piano solo and electronic tape
Calligrammes (1983–1984) for harp and chamber orchestra
Océanides (1986) for chamber orchestra
Swing (1986) for piano
Sur la margelle du monde (1987) for chamber orchestra
Le Livre de Tchen (1988) for three percussionists and mime
Vent solaire (1989–1990) for shakuhachi and orchestra
Incantation (1989) for organ
Cantilène (1990) for violin alone
Dragon de lumière (1991) for three wind instruments and five strings
Le chant des sables (1992) for violoncello, harp and gongs
Echo (1992) for flute
Hi Summer (1993) for voice, harp, percussion and synthesiser

References

1946 births
1993 deaths
20th-century classical composers
Swiss music educators
Women classical composers
Swiss classical composers
Women in electronic music
Musicians from Geneva
Women music educators
20th-century women composers
20th-century Swiss composers